Robertsdale Historic District is a national historic district located at Robertsdale in Wood Township, Huntingdon County, Pennsylvania. The district includes 102 contributing buildings and 1 contributing site.  The buildings primarily date between about 1873 and the 1920s and are associated with the development of the company town by the Rockhill Iron and Coal Company. They include the company office, store, and railway depot, along with workers' housing.  Notable buildings include the company store (1873-1874), Rockhill Iron and Coal Company office building (1914), Robertsdale Post Office (c. 1915), East Broad Top Railroad depot (1914), Robertsdale Hotel (c. 1912), Reality Theatre (1948), McClain Store (1911-1923), superintendent's house (1896), Methodist Parsonage (1922), Wood Township Elementary School (1934), and the Methodist Episcopal Church (1890s).

It was listed on the National Register of Historic Places in 1992.

References

External links

Historic American Buildings Survey in Pennsylvania
Historic districts on the National Register of Historic Places in Pennsylvania
Gothic Revival architecture in Pennsylvania
Historic districts in Huntingdon County, Pennsylvania
National Register of Historic Places in Huntingdon County, Pennsylvania